Wyatt & Nolting was an architectural partnership of James Bosley Noel Wyatt (1847–1926) and William G. Nolting (1866–1940).

The partnership completed numerous works that are listed on the U.S. National Register of Historic Places:

 Emmanuel Episcopal Church, Bel Air, 301 N. Main St., Bel Air, MD, 1896
 Clarence M. Mitchell Jr. Courthouse, Baltimore, MD, 1896-1900
 Liriodendron (Bel Air, Maryland), 501 and 502 W. Gordon St., Bel Air, MD, 1898
 Old Norfolk City Hall, 235 E. Plume St., Norfolk, VA, 1898-1900
 Fifth Regiment Armory, 210—247 W. Hoffman St., Baltimore, MD, 1901
 Pikesville Armory, 610 Reisterstown Rd., Pikesville, MD, 1903
 Victor Cullen Center, Old Administration Building, Victor Cullen Center Campus, Sabillasville, MD, 1907
 Victor Cullen School Power House, MD 81, Sabillasville, MD, 1908
 Virginia Bank and Trust Building, 101 Granby St., Norfolk, VA, 1908-09
 The Garrett Building, 233-239 Redwood St., Baltimore, MD, 1913
 Physics Building, later Kreiger Hall, Homewood Campus of Johns Hopkins University, Baltimore, 1928-1933
 One or more works in Clifton Park, Bounded by Hartford Rd., Erdman Ave., Clifton Park Terrace, the Baltimore Belt RR and Sinclair Ln., Baltimore, MD, (Niersee & Neilson; Wyatt and Nolting)

References

External links 
 Elevation view from 1928

Architecture firms based in Maryland